

This is a list of the National Register of Historic Places listings in Tehama County, California.

This is intended to be a complete list of the properties and districts on the National Register of Historic Places in Tehama County, California, United States. Latitude and longitude coordinates are provided for many National Register properties and districts; these locations may be seen together in a Google map.

There are 10 properties and districts listed on the National Register in the county.

Current listings

|}

See also

List of National Historic Landmarks in California
National Register of Historic Places listings in California
California Historical Landmarks in Tehama County, California

References

Tehama